Sannina is a genus of moths in the family Sesiidae.

Species
Sannina uroceriformis  Walker, 1856

References

Sesiidae